The 2016 AFC Champions League group stage was played from 23 February to 4 May 2016. A total of 32 teams competed in the group stage to decide the 16 places in the knockout stage of the 2016 AFC Champions League.

Draw

The seeding of each team in the draw was determined by their association and their qualifying position within their association. The mechanism of the draw was as follows:
For the West Zone, a draw was held for the three associations with three direct entrants (Saudi Arabia, Iran, Uzbekistan) to determine the seeds 1 placed in order for Groups A, B and C. The remaining teams were then allocated to the groups according to the rules set by AFC.
For the East Zone, a draw was held for the two associations with three direct entrants (South Korea, Japan) to determine the seeds 1 placed in order for Groups E and F. The remaining teams were then allocated to the groups according to the rules set by AFC.

The following 32 teams (16 from West Zone, 16 from East Zone) entered into the group-stage draw, which included the 24 direct entrants and the eight winners of the qualifying play-off, whose identity were not known at the time of the draw.

Format

Tiebreakers

Schedule
The schedule of each matchday was as follows.

On 25 January 2016, the AFC announced the following changes to the schedule due to Saudi Arabia's refusal to play in Iran after the attack on their diplomatic missions in Iran and the ensuing deterioration of Iran–Saudi Arabia relations:
Group A: change matchday 1 (23 February) with matchday 6 (4 May)
Group B: change matchday 2 (1 March) with matchday 5 (20 April)
Group C: change matchday 1 (24 February) with matchday 6 (3 May)
Group D: change matchday 2 (2 March) with matchday 5 (19 April)
After the changes, all matches between teams from Iran and Saudi Arabia (including possible play-off winners) were rescheduled to be played on matchdays 5 and 6 (19–20 April and 3–4 May). The venues of these matches would be decided after an evaluation deadline of 15 March 2016. As there had not been a return to normal relations between the two countries by then with Saudi Arabia refusing to lift their travel restrictions to Iran, the AFC accepted the Saudi Arabian Football Federation's proposal of playing all matches between teams from Iran and Saudi Arabia in neutral venues. This involved a total of six matches, two each in Groups A, B and C (no matches were moved in Group D as the play-off team from Iran failed to advance to the group).

On 31 March 2016, the AFC announced that they have approved the neutral venues, with teams from Iran moving their home matches to Oman, and teams from Saudi Arabia moving their home matches to Qatar and the United Arab Emirates.

Groups

Group A

Group B

Group C

Group D

Group E

Group F

Group G

Group H

Notes

References

External links
AFC Champions League, the-AFC.com

2